Varun Chopra (born 21 June 1987) is an English former cricketer who captained the English U-19 cricket team in series against Sri Lanka in 2005 and India in 2006. Chopra attended Ilford County High School and played for Ilford Cricket Club. In September 2021, Chopra announced his retirement from cricket.

Biography
He played for Essex, and made his debut for the senior side in 2006, making 106 in a drawn game against Gloucestershire, becoming the youngest player to score a century for Essex in county cricket.

The latest to come off an impressive conveyor belt of young batsmen at Essex, of which includes former England Test and ODI captain Alastair Cook. Varun Chopra is an opening batsman of considerable talent. He has already impressed as captain of England Under-19s, whom he led to a comprehensive series whitewash of Sri Lanka in 2005. He was on fire himself, averaging 48 in the Tests and striking a half-century in one of the two ODIs. But life was about to get immediately tougher for him and his side – an 11–0 pasting followed on the winter tour of Bangladesh.

Varun Chopra joined the Willetton Dragons cricket club in the 2006/07 season to play first grade in Western Australia.

Chopra's domestic season started off well in 2006 – he struck a hundred and a fifty on Championship debut and has been slowly making his mark in the first team, even keeping Grant Flower out of the side.

Chopra joined Warwickshire for the start of the 2010 season. In 2011 he became the first Warwickshire batsman to score double tons in back to back county matches.

After seven, largely successful seasons at Warwickshire, he returned to Essex during the 2016 season. In 2017 and 2018 he played in the championship only when
Alastair Cook was not available, as Nick Browne took the other opener position, but in limited-overs games he was first choice. In 2019 he had spectacular run in the London One-Day Cup scoring 
3 centuries and averaging 84
, but Essex did not qualify for the
play-offs.

Chopra was part of the England Lions' tour of Australia in 2013, and made a century against Australia A.

In July 2019, he was selected to play for the Amsterdam Knights in the inaugural edition of the Euro T20 Slam cricket tournament. However, the following month the tournament was cancelled.

Chopra joined Middlesex on loan in July 2021, primarily to play in the Royal London Cup.

References

External links
 
 
 Player Profile at Warwickshire County Cricket Club

1987 births
Living people
People from Barking, London
English cricketers
Essex cricketers
Warwickshire cricketers
British Asian cricketers
Marylebone Cricket Club cricketers
Sussex cricketers
British sportspeople of Indian descent
English people of Indian descent